Thomas Ronald Crombie (3 June 1930 – February 2018) was a Scottish professional association footballer of the 1950s. He played in the Football League for Gillingham, making 17 appearances.

References

1930 births
2018 deaths
Footballers from Kirkcaldy
Scottish footballers
Association football defenders
Gillingham F.C. players
Blackpool F.C. players
Jeanfield Swifts F.C. players
English Football League players